Sebastian Kartfjord (born 6 August 1987) is a Norwegian cyclist. He was born in Bodø, but moved to Sandnes when he was five, and has represented the club Sandnes BMX. He competed at the 2008 Summer Olympics, in Men's BMX but did not qualify for the semifinals.

References

External links
 
 
 

1987 births
Living people
Norwegian male cyclists
Olympic cyclists of Norway
Cyclists at the 2008 Summer Olympics
People from Sandnes
Sportspeople from Bodø